The military conquests of the Chinese Ming dynasty were instrumental to the dynasty's hold on power during the early Ming.

Hongwu reign (1368–1398)
Early in his reign, Zhu Yuanzhang (Hongwu Emperor), the founder of the Ming dynasty, laid down instructions to later generations that included advice to the Chief Military Commission on those countries that posed a threat to the Ming polity, and those that did not. He stated that those to the north were dangerous, while those to the south did not constitute a threat, and were not to be subject to attack. Yet, either despite this, or as a result of it, it was the polities to the south that suffered the greatest effects of Ming expansion over the following century.

Conquest of Yunnan

In 1369, not long after Zhu Yuanzhang founded his new dynasty, he sent proclamations for the instruction of the countries of Yunnan and Japan. This early recognition of Yunnan (which lay beyond the Ming) as a "country" was to change very soon thereafter. By 1380, Yunnan, which was still held by a Northern Yuan prince, was considered to belong to China since the Han dynasty, and 250,000 troops were deployed in an attack on the polity, taking Dali, Lijiang and Jinchi in 1382. As a result, the Ming founder took control of the major urban centers of the north-western part of what is today Yunnan, including several Tai areas.

By 1387, the Hongwu Emperor had set his sights further and prepared for an attack on the Baiyi (Möng Mao) polity to the south. Under the commander Mu Ying, the Ming forces attacked the Baiyi with firearms, taking a claimed 30,000 heads. Si Lunfa was subsequently dunned for all the costs of the military expedition against him, as a quid pro quo for recognizing him as ruler of the Baiyi.

The new polities "created" (or recognized) in Yunnan under the first Ming ruler were known to the Ming as "native offices" (tu si), since initially they were usually left under the control of the hereditary rulers, by which the Ming exerted control, and engaged in economic expropriation through tribute demands and other levies. Che-li (Jinghong), for example, was established as a "native office" in 1377. Here, then, was the beginnings of the process by which formerly Southeast Asian polities were gradually absorbed into the Chinese polity.

As a result, the new polities were subjected to a wide range of tribute demands, labor, and other levies, including troop provision. As an example, in the case of the Tai-Mao polity of Lu-Chuan/Ping-Mian, the Ming court demanded 15,000 horses, 500 elephants and 30,000 cattle from the ruler Si Lunfa in 1397. Subsequently, large silver demands (silver, in lieu of labor) were levied on Lu-Chuan. The annual amount of 6,900 Liang of silver was initially set, and then it was almost tripled to 18,000 Liang. When it was realized that this was impossible to meet, the levy was reduced to the original amount. Other diverse levies were applied to the other polities, enforced through the use or threat of military force.

Maritime policies
The Hongwu reign was marked by frequent despatch of envoys to foreign polities, and the court reception of foreign envoys from the maritime polities of Vietnam, Champa, Cambodia, Siam, Cochin, Sanfoqi, Java, Japan, Ryūkyū, Brunei, and Korea. They were drawn to China by the trade concessions available to tribute envoys, and the rewards given to the rulers who submitted the "tribute". However, the machinations of the Ming state meant that diplomatic links were also a major method by which court insiders, within the system, could gain influence and control. It was the failure to report the arrival of an envoy from Champa that led to Hu Weiyong (胡惟庸), the Ming prime minister from 1377 to 1380, being executed on charges of treason.  Members of the Ming bureaucracy were likely already heavily involved in Southeast Asian maritime politics by the 1390s.

In the early 1370s, the coastal people in China were forbidden to cross the oceans, other than on official missions. Fujian military officials, who had privately sent people across the seas to engage in trade, were punished not long thereafter. The prohibition was reinstated in 1381 and 1384, and an imperial command "strictly prohibiting people from having contact with foreigners" was promulgated in 1390. The frequency of these prohibitions suggests that they were not very effective, and the reason given for the imperial command was that "at this time in Guangdong/Guangxi, Zhejiang and Fujian, there were foolish people who did not know of these prohibitions, and frequently engaged in private trade with foreigners". The prohibition on going abroad to trade privately was reiterated in 1397. Whether these prohibitions actually affected maritime trade between southern China and Southeast Asia is not immediately apparent from the Ming texts, and perhaps through further archaeological research, it will be possible to piece together the ebbs and flows in maritime trade between China and Southeast Asia during this period.

Yongle reign (1403–1424)

Knowledge of the reign of the Hongwu Emperor's successor, the Jianwen Emperor (1399–1402), has been almost entirely lost to us as a result of the civil war and coup d'état launched by his uncle, Zhu Di (Yongle Emperor). In the aftermath, Zhu Di tried to eliminate all evidence of his nephew's reign from the historical record. As such, the links between Ming China and Southeast Asia in this crucial period must remain in the realm of conjecture.

The period of Yongle, as Zhu Di was to name his reign, is however, very well-documented, and it is this period in which many of the most dramatic Ming interactions with Southeast Asia occurred. Like his father, after coming to power, Zhu Di ordered the Ministry of Rites to send demands to foreign polities, requiring them to bring tribute to the court. In the same year, he also established the Maritime Trade Supervisorates in the provinces of Zhejiang, Fujian, and Guangdong to control sea trade with all foreign polities. In 1405, hostels were established under each of the above-noted provinces to look after the foreign envoys who came from abroad. It was already apparent at this early stage of the reign that the Yongle Emperor was planning to have much to do with maritime Asia.

At the same time, the new emperor was also anxious to advertise the cultural superiority of the Ming to the rest of the known world and to this end, he distributed 10,000 copies of the Biographies of Exemplary Women (烈女傳) to various non-Chinese polities for their moral instruction. Whether any motifs from this Chinese text have appeared in Southeast Asian literature, has not yet, it appears, been studied. Court calendars were also distributed to Southeast Asian polities by the Ministry of Rites.

Invasion of Vietnam 

A number of major military expeditions into Southeast Asia occurred during the Yongle reign. In 1406, in an effort to increase Ming influence and power in Đại Ngu (Vietnam), the country that was known to the Ming as Annam (the "Pacified South"), it had appeared that Hồ Quý Ly, a powerful noble of Vietnam had seized power in Vietnam and attempted to murder all members of the current Trần ruling family. The Yongle emperor attempted to solve the problem peacefully, dispatching envoys and the self-claimed surviving member of the House of Trần, Trần Thiên Bính (陳添平) to Vietnam. He was assassinated and in that same year, two huge Chinese armies were sent along two routes, via Yunnan and Guangxi, into Đại Ngu. Chinese forces claimed that seven million Vietnamese were killed in this initial campaign to take the polity. In 1407, Đại Ngu became Ming China's 14th province, and remained so until 1428, when the Ming were forced to withdraw by a Vietnamese revolt led by Lê Lợi. In contrast to the name Annam ("Pacified South"), this 21-year period was one of almost incessant fighting.

As soon as the Ming forces took control of the polity, changes were instituted. In the first year, 7,600 tradesmen and artisans (including gun founders) captured in Đại Ngu were sent to the Ming capital at today's Nanjing. This stripping of some of the most skilled members of society extensively affected Vietnamese society. Subsequently, more Chinese and non-Chinese troops were brought into the region to maintain some semblance of control, and a wide range of new organs of civil administration were re-established. By 1408, Annam had 41 subprefectures, and 208 counties, all administered in a Chinese mode but often staffed by Vietnamese. Regardless of the extent to which political hegemony was thrown off in the late 1420s, when the Ming were driven out, the administrative legacy of the Chinese occupation must have had a major and wide-ranging impact on the society of the country. In a claimed effort to further inculcate Chinese ways, Confucian schools, which existed already from several hundred years before, were re-established in Chinese style, and Chinese were appointed to teach in them. In an attempt to assimilate the country into the Chinese cultural sphere, this period saw an invaluable part of Vietnamese academic and historical works destroyed by the Ming authorities.

In 1407 a new Maritime Trade Supervisorate was established at Yuntun, while two new such offices were established at Xinping (新平) and Shunhua (順化) in 1408. Thus, within two years, three maritime trade supervisors had been created in this new province, the same number as existed in the rest of China. This was a clear indication of the desire of the Ming to control maritime trade to the south and exploit the economic advantage of such control.

Other economic exploitation involved grain taxes, annual levies of lacquer, sappanwood, kingfisher feathers, fans and aromatics, and the imposition of monopolies on gold, silver, salt, iron, and fish. In addition, eunuchs were sent to Jiaozhi with the task of collecting treasure for the Emperor, but an equal amount of treasure collection appears to have been done for themselves. The rapaciousness of the eunuchs, at least as depicted in Ming accounts, was such that even the emperors intervened in appointments. The Hongxi Emperor objected to the re-sending of the eunuch Ma Qi to Annam, when he attempted to have himself reappointed to control the gold, silver, aromatics and pearls of the region in 1424.

By 1414, the Ming was sufficiently well-entrenched in the northern Annam to allow it to push further, establishing four further subprefectures in a region south of Annam, which had formerly been administered by the Hồ dynasty and still free from Chinese influence, as well as some parts of the northern border of Champa. There are authors who believe that the Chinese occupation of Ðại Việt in this period played some role in the later southward expansion of the Vietnamese state. However, the Vietnamese southward expansion had begun in the Lý dynasty of Ðại Việt and the major advances were made by Nguyễn Lords at least two centuries later. The levies and demands made on the new province by the Ming meant that its capacity to feed itself suffered. On numerous occasions in the 1420s, it was necessary to arrange transport of grain from Guangdong and Guangxi into Jiaozhi. Such deficiencies would have had profound effects on the social structure and social stability of the region, compounded by warfare and the imposition of Chinese norms. The range of colonial policies the Ming pursued had wide-ranging effects, both on the society at the time, as well as on the future development of the Vietnamese state.

Conquest of Tai polities
Prior to Yongle's invasion of Ðại Ngu in 1406, he engaged himself in further expansion into the polities of Yunnan. By 1403, he had created new military guards on the distant border, with two independent battalions, directly under the Regional Military Commission, being established at Tengchong and Yongchang in 1403. These were to be the bases from which the subsequent further occupation and control of the Tai regions were to be pursued. In the same year, new Chief's Offices were established in Yunnan, at Zhele Dian, Dahou, Ganyai, Wandian and Lujiang, and in 1406, a further four Chief's Offices were established under Ningyuan Guard, in what is today Sip Song Chau Tai in Vietnam. When the Tai polities did not submit to the requirements of the new Ming emperor, military actions were launched against them. In 1405, for example, the senior Chinese representative in Yunnan, Mu Sheng, launched an attack on Lanna (Babai).

After some sort of recognition or acceptance of the superior position of the Ming court, Chinese clerks or registry managers were appointed to the "native offices" to "assist" the traditional ruler, and ensure that Ming interests were served. Chinese clerks were appointed to carry out Chinese language duties in the native offices of Yunnan in 1404, while similar circulating-official clerk positions (to be filled by Chinese) were established in seven Chief's Offices in Yunnan in 1406. The "native office" polities were then subject to demands in terms of gold and silver in lieu of labor (差發銀/金), administered by the Ministry of Revenue, and were also required to provide troops to assist in further Ming campaigns. Mubang, for example, was required to send its troops against Lanna (Babai) in 1406.

See also
Ming–Hồ War
Imjin War
Ming–Kotte War
Ming–Turpan conflict 
Ming campaign against the Uriankhai 
Yongle Emperor's campaigns against the Mongols

References

External links
 Southeast Asia in the Ming Shi-lu: An Open Access Resource, Geoff Wade
 Wade, Geoff (2004) "Ming China and Southeast Asia in the 15th Century: A Reappraisal"
 Map of Mainland Polities Mentioned in the Ming Shi-lu
 Southeast Asian Polities Mentioned in the Ming Shi-lu

14th-century conflicts
15th-century conflicts
Military history of the Ming dynasty
Tai history
Yongle Emperor